The Little Vampire 3D, also known as The Little Vampire, is a 2017 3D computer-animated vampire film directed by Richard Claus and Karsten Kiilerich and based on the children's book series of the same name by German writer Angela Sommer-Bodenburg.

Cast 
Jim Carter as Rookery
Rasmus Hardiker as Rudolph Sackville-Bagg and Gregory Sackville-Bagg
Alice Krige as Freda Sackville-Bagg
Tim Pigott-Smith as Frederick Sackville-Bagg
Miriam Margolyes as Wulftrud
Matthew Marsh as Gernot
Joseph Kloska as Maney
Phoebe Givron-Taylor as Anna Sackville-Bagg

Jim Carter and Alice Krige reprised their roles from the 2000 live-action adaptation of The Little Vampire.

Release 
The film had its world premiere in the Netherlands on 5 October 2017. It was released in Germany, Denmark and Italy on 26 October 2017, and in the UK on 25 May 2018. It received 19,767 admissions in Danish cinemas, and had a worldwide gross of $13,808,590. The UK theatrical and DVD versions were cut by 29 seconds in order to remove a scene involving electricity in order to achieve a U rating from the BBFC.

The film received generally negative reviews from critics, and on review aggregator Rotten Tomatoes the film holds a score of 14% based on 14 critical reviews, indicating a "rotten" score.

See also 
The Little Vampire (2000), live-action film also based on the titular book series

References

External links 

2017 films
2017 animated films
2017 computer-animated films
2017 comedy horror films
2010s fantasy comedy films
Children's horror films
Vampire comedy films
German vampire films
Films based on children's books
Dutch animated films
Films based on German novels
2010s English-language films
Films directed by Karsten Kiilerich
2010s German films